Bushuikha is a rural locality (a settlement) in Komyanskoye Rural Settlement, Gryazovetsky District, Vologda Oblast, Russia. The population was 437 as of 2002. There are 5 streets. The timezone of Bushuikha (settlement) is UTC+3:00.

Geography 
Bushuikha is located 31 km northeast of Gryazovets (the district's administrative centre) by road. Zarechye is the nearest rural locality.

References 

Rural localities in Gryazovetsky District